Nine Parchments is a twin stick action role-playing game developed and published by Frozenbyte. The game was released for Microsoft Windows, PlayStation 4, Xbox One, and Nintendo Switch in 2017. The game's story revolves around students of the Astral Academy searching for the missing nine parchments.

Gameplay 

Nine Parchments is a co-op action role-playing game utilizing twin stick controlled combat played in a 3D environment from an overhead view. The game can be played in single-player or with up to four players in local or online cooperative play. The game has two modes: adventure and arena. In adventure, players go through 32 levels, defeating waves of enemies and bosses along the way. Arena was added in a later update and has players survive more difficult enemy waves in small areas.

The game includes eight playable characters, with a ninth added in a free update. Each character has three different starting spells with different elements, and new spells are learned by collecting the missing parchments. As characters progress, they level up to unlock points to spend on their skill trees. Three additional variations with different color schemes and starting spells can be unlocked for each character through achievements. Equippable hats and staves can be obtained from quills and chests or by defeating certain enemies.

Plot 
After an explosion in the Astral Academy causes the nine spell parchments to go missing, the apprentice wizards of the academy, Cornelius Crownsteed, Gislan of Alcyon, Marvek the Torrid, Carabel the Glacial, Rudolfus the Strange, The Mechanical Owl, and Nim the Cleaner set out to search for them. Upon collecting all nine parchments and defeating Anastasia the Lich, the students return to the academy only to have Professor Butternut take the parchments back for safekeeping while they continue their studies instead of letting them having said parchments stored in their spellbooks via. Ritual of Sealing.

Reception 

Nine Parchments received "mixed or average" reviews from professional critics according to review aggregator website Metacritic.

References

External links
 

2017 video games
Action role-playing video games
Cooperative video games
Fantasy video games
Frozenbyte games
Multiplayer and single-player video games
Multiplayer online games
Nintendo Switch games
Indie video games
PlayStation 4 games
Video games developed in Finland
Video games scored by Ari Pulkkinen
Windows games
Xbox One games